Noel Sherman (30 June 1930 Brooklyn – 4 June 1972 New York) was an American lyricist and nightclub producer. Among the standards that Sherman composed, often with his brother Joe Sherman, are "Ramblin' Rose", "Graduation Day", "Eso Beso" ("That Kiss!") (no), "To the Ends of the Earth", and "Juke Box Baby".

Career 
Sherman, born to Julius Sherman, a dentist, and Mary Rothman graduated from New York University where he was inducted into the Phi Beta Kappa honor society. His brother, Joe, was his chief collaborator.

Bibliography

Selected copyrights 
Original copyrights

 Catalog of Copyright Entries, Third Series, Music, Library of Congress, Copyright Office

<li> Vol. 10; Part 5A, No. 1, January–June1956 (1957). "Graduation Day". © Sheldon Music Inc.; 23 April 1956; EP99021. p. 244.
<li> Vol. 10; Part 5A, No. 1, January–June1956 (1957). "Juke-Box Baby". © Winneton Music Corp.; 5 March 1956; EP98281. p. 244.
<li> Vol. 10; Part 5A, No. 2, July–December 1956 (1957). "To the Ends of the Earth". © Winneton Music Corp.; 23 October 1956; EP103529. p. 705.
<li> Vol. 16; Part 5, No. 2, July–December 1962 (1963). "Eso Beso" ("That Kiss"). © Flanka Music Corp.; 12 September 1962; EP735978. p. 1164.
<li> Vol. 16; Part 5, No. 2, July–December 1962 (1963). "Ramblin' Rose". © Sweco Music Corp.; 6 August 1962; EP166499. p. 1465. (assigned to Comet Music Ltd. in 1962)

Copyright renewals

 U.S. Copyright Office website (U.S. Copyright Search link)

<li> "Ramblin' Rose". © Renewal: 5 January 1990; RE465829

Notes

References

 "Among the standards that Sherman composed are "Ramblin' Rose," "Graduation Day," "Eso Beso" and "To the Ends of the Earth".

 

1930 births
1972 deaths
20th-century American composers